Chinese University Student Press (CUSP, 中大學生報) is a magazine published by the Chinese University of Hong Kong Students' Union. The CUSP is considered a liberal magazine as it sparked controversy because of its publication of the sex column.

References

Hong Kong Authorities Ponder Labeling Bible 'Indecent', Fox News
Bible drawn into Hong Kong sex publication row, Reuters
Bible Nazis Seek Worldwide Ban On The Bible, WDC Media News

External links
 CUSP Official Website
 Bible complain website
 The blog of volunteer organizer at 71 demonstration, still active

Chinese University of Hong Kong
Chinese-language magazines
Magazines published in Hong Kong
Liberal organizations
Magazines with year of establishment missing
Student magazines